Thomas Matthew Hausman (March 31, 1953 – January 16, 2019) was a Major League Baseball pitcher. He was the first free agent signing of the New York Mets.

Early career
Hausman was born in Mobridge, South Dakota, but moved to California as a child. He was an All-state baseball and basketball player, and pitched two years of American Legion ball in La Verne, California. The Milwaukee Brewers drafted the right hander right out of high school in the tenth round of the 1971 Major League Baseball draft.

Minor leagues
Hausman spent his first professional baseball season in the class "A" New York–Penn League with the fourth-place Newark Co-Pilots. He appeared in thirteen games and 74 innings and allowed 54 hits and 30 walks. He struck out 54 and had an earned run average of 2.68.

His  season was spent playing for Joe Nossek and the class "A" Midwest League champions in Danville. An injury placing him on the disabled list from June 13 to August 6, limiting his appearances to only ten games, with 55 innings pitched. He gave up 53 hits and 17 walks, struck out 32 and his ERA was a 2.13.

With a record of 12–9, he allowed 193 hits, 49 walks, struck out 56 and had a rather high 4.44 ERA, however, his performance earned him a promotion to AAA for the  season.

In 26 games for the Pacific Coast League's last-place Sacramento Solons, he led the league in complete games with eleven. In 180 innings, he struck out 104, but gave up 215 hits, fifty of which were home runs. As a result, he had an inflated 6.00 ERA.

Milwaukee Brewers
He made his major league debut in relief in a 10-1 loss to the New York Yankees on April 26. On May 27, Hausman entered a game against the Chicago White Sox in relief of Ed Sprague in the second inning with the Brewers already down 3-0. As soon as Hausman entered the game, an error by Robin Yount at shortstop made the score 4-0. From there, Hausman pitched 6.2 innings, and allowed three runs. The Brewers, meanwhile, battered Wilbur Wood for eight runs to earn Hausman his firs major league victory.

Hausman's first major league start was cut short by a back injury. He made his second start in the first game of a July 6 doubleheader with the Detroit Tigers. He faced four batters without recording an out. Undeterred, he pitched seven innings in the second game.

His record was 3-2 with a 3.92 ERA when he was moved into the starting rotation. On July 27, Hausman pitched eight innings of scoreless ball against the Baltimore Orioles, and was in line for his first win as a starting pitcher when he handed the ball to relief pitcher Tom Murphy with a 6-0 lead. The bullpen imploded for six runs, and Hausman ended up with a no decision. Facing the O's again in his next start, Hausman pitched his first career complete game, and lost, 3-1. Hausman would end up going 0-4 with a 4.66 ERA in August. His recurring back injury forced the Brewers to shut him down for the last month of the season.

In , Hausman appeared in only three games with the Brewers, all in relief. In three innings of work, he gave up three hits, three walks and two earned runs. The rest of the year was spent with the AAA Spokane Indians who finished last in the PCL West. He played in 22 games (111 innings) and allowed 135 hits and 36 walks for an ERA of 5.68. Hausman struck out forty and was on their suspended list from August 14 to September 7.

In , Hausman remained the whole year at Spokane where he led the PCL in games started with 30. He completed a career high 207 innings, had a 13–6 record for the second place team. Hausman gave up 251 hits, 55 walks with a 4.22 ERA. He struck out 88. He declared as a free agent after the season.

New York Mets
On, November 21, 1977, Hausman signed as a free agent with the New York Mets. Despite being the franchise's first free agent signing, Hausman began the  season in triple A with the Tidewater Tides. In ten starts, Hausman went 5-2 with a 1.22 ERA to quickly earn a call up to New York, however, a stint on the DL from May 25 to June 17 delayed his Mets debut until July 7. He earned his first win as a starter on July 17 against the Atlanta Braves, and also collected his first career run batted in. His finest start of the season was his third start, also against the Braves. He pitched eight innings of shutout ball before handing the ball to Mets closer Skip Lockwood. All told, Hausman went 3-3 with a 4.70 ERA.

Hausman, again, began the  season in AAA. For Tidewater (12 g, 72 inn), Hausman gave up 75 hits, 23 walks and struck out 27. His ERA was at 4.50. When he came up in June, he split his time between starting and relief roles, and lost all four of his first four decisions despite a relatively low 2.84 ERA. He earned his first career save on July 8 against the San Diego Padres, pitching 3.1 innings of one hit ball. His first win of the season was a complete game victory over Vida Blue and the San Francisco Giants six days later. He was lifted early in his July 31 start against the Pittsburgh Pirates when he hurt his lower back covering first on a ground ball. After sitting out the entire month of August, he wouldn't earn a second win until September 26 against the Chicago Cubs. For the season, he went 2-6 with two saves and a 2.75 ERA.

Hausman began the  season as a starter. After falling to 0-1 with a 6.75 ERA, he was moved into a "mop up duty" role in the bullpen, but an exceptional month of June changed that. His first win of the season came on June 6 against the Pirates. He entered in the fifth inning, and pitched 4.2 innings of scoreless ball. His next win came in his next appearance, when he pitched five innings of shutout ball against the Los Angeles Dodgers. Perhaps his finest performance came on June 27, when he earned his only save on the season by pitching three innings of no hit ball against the eventual World Series champion Philadelphia Phillies.

The strong pitching continued into July. He pitched five innings, and allowed one unearned run to pick up his fourth win of the season against the Montreal Expos on July 3. From June 6 through July 18, Hausman was 4-1 with a 0.94 ERA. For the season, he went 6-5 with a 3.98 ERA. He pitched a career high 122 innings, and gave up 125 hits and only 26 walks while striking out 53.

In 33 innings, he allowed 28 hits and 7 walks with 13 strike outs and an ERA of 2.18. He pitched part of the year for Tidewater (9.00 ERA) and was in 21 games for the Mets (37 inn, 44 hits, 6 walks, 16 so, 4.42 ERA, .295 OBA). On September 10, he was reunited with his former manager Joe Torre, when he was traded to the first place Braves for Carlos Diaz. During their stretch run, he appeared in 3 games (4 innings) for his new club, allowing 6 hits and 4 walks.

Late career
Hausman signed with the Pirates during Spring training . He appeared in four games with the Pacific Coast League's Hawaii Islanders. going 2–1 with a 1.59 ERA. His record was 3–4 with a 5.25 ERA.

Career stats

Death
Hausman died on January 16, 2019.

References

, or The Ultimate Mets database

1953 births
2019 deaths
Major League Baseball pitchers
Milwaukee Brewers players
New York Mets players
Atlanta Braves players
Hawaii Islanders players
People from Mobridge, South Dakota
Baseball players from South Dakota